The 37th edition of the annual Hypo-Meeting took place on May 28 and May 29, 2011 in Götzis, Austria. The track and field competition, featuring a men's decathlon and a women's heptathlon event was part of the 2011 IAAF World Combined Events Challenge. Trey Hardee and Jessica Ennis led the men's and women's competition, respectively, after the first day.  Ennis (6790 points) and Trey Hardee (8689 points) were the winners of the events overall.

Men's Decathlon

Schedule

May 28 

May 29

Records

Results

Women's heptathlon

Schedule

May 29 

May 30

Records

Results

References

Results
 Official results by IAAF
 
 

2011
Hypo-Meeting
Hypo-Meeting